The Journal of the History of the Behavioral Sciences is a quarterly peer-reviewed academic journal covering the history of social and behavioral sciences. It was established in 1965 and is published by John Wiley & Sons. The editor-in-chief is Alexandra Rutherford (York University). According to the Journal Citation Reports, the journal has a 2020 impact factor of 0.667, ranking it 22nd out of 34 journals in the category "History of Social Sciences".

References

External links

History of science journals
Behavioural sciences
Publications established in 1965
Quarterly journals
English-language journals
Wiley (publisher) academic journals